Phaio is a genus of moths in the subfamily Arctiinae.

Species
 Phaio acquiguttata Dognin, 1909
 Phaio albicincta Schaus, 1896
 Phaio aurata Schaus, 1892
 Phaio bacchans Schaus, 1892
 Phaio caeruleonigra Schaus, 1905
 Phaio cephalena Druce, 1883
 Phaio geminiguttata Dognin, 1911
 Phaio longipennis Neum., 1894
 Phaio quadriguttata Dognin, 1909
 Phaio salmoni Druce, 1883
 Phaio stratiotes Dyar, 1914
 Phaio sylva Schaus, 1896
 Phaio unimacula Rothschild, 1911

References

Natural History Museum Lepidoptera generic names catalog

Arctiinae